Fraijanes is a town, with a population of 44,117 (2018 census), and a municipality in the Guatemala department of Guatemala.

It is known for its fine tasting coffee, which is slightly more acidic than that of Antigua Guatemala.

History

Archbishop Pedro Cortés y Larraz wrote in his book Descripción Geográfico-Moral De La Diócesis de Guatemala (Moral and geographic description of Guatemala Diocesis) that, after the Jesuits were expelled from the Spanish colonies in 1767, they left behind a rich hacienda in the area where the modern Fraijanes municipality stands. It was given to two secular priests called Juan Milán and Juan Álvarez. These priests earned the respect and love of the people from the area and, in 1860, the region was renamed "Frailes Juanes" in their honor. Eventually, the name changed into "Fray Juanes" and finally into "Fraijanes".

Jesuit hacienda

In 1646, Fraijanes had been given to the Society of Jesus to establish a doctrine; there is no religious evidence left in the ruins, making it difficult to assign them to a regular order in particular. The work from Cortés y Larraz shows that the area belonged to Jesuits. Another version suggests that the ruins are from a rich Spanish hacienda and base the assumption on the presence of a tunnel that connects the main residence to a small church.

There are several legends about the ruins. The main one is called «La Cueva del Negro» ("The Black Man Cave") which tells the story of a black slave who escaped and sought refuge in the abandoned hacienda. At first, he survived by harvesting corn and hunting small animals. Eventually, loneliness drove him mad and turned into a terrible cannibal who tormented the nearby settlements until a peasant killed him.

Climate 

Fraijanes has a subtropical highland climate (Köppen: Cwb).

Government and infrastructure
Pavon Prison, Pavoncito Prison and other units of the Dirección General del Sistema Penitenciario de Guatemala are in Fraijanes.

Education

The Lycée Français Jules Verne, an elite French international school, is in Fraijanes.

Geographic location

See also

 Guatemala Department

Notes and references

References

Municipalities of the Guatemala Department
1646 establishments in the Spanish Empire